Ouled Ahmed Timmi is a commune in Adrar District, Adrar Province, in south-central Algeria. According to the 2008 census it has a population of 13,547, up from 11,976 in 1998, with an annual growth rate of 1.3%.

Geography

The commune covers a series of populated oases in the northern part of the Tuat region to the immediate west and south of Adrar.

Climate

Ouled Ahmed Timmi has a hot desert climate (Köppen climate classification BWh), with extremely hot summers and mild winters, and very little precipitation throughout the year.

Transportation

The villages of the commune to the northwest (such as Ouinna, Melouka and Kousan) are connected to the western side of Adrar city by provincial roads, and to the villages in Bouda commune further north. The villages to the southeast (such as Ouled Brahim, Mahidia and Zaouia Sidi Bekri) are connected to the N6 national highway on its way south from Adrar.

Education

5.1% of the population has a tertiary education, and another 15.9% has completed secondary education. The overall literacy rate is 75.7%, and is 85.4% among males and 65.9% among females.

Localities
As of 1984, the commune was composed of 15 localities:

Ouled Brahim
Taridalt
Ouled Ahmed
Beni Tamer
El Mansourria
Ouled Bouhefs
Mahidia
Zaouia Sidi Bekri
Kousam
Bouzane
Ouled Aïssa
Ouled Aroussa
Melouka
Mimoune
Ouinna

References

Neighbouring towns and cities

Communes of Adrar Province
Cities in Algeria
Algeria